The 2d Weather Wing was a military meteorological (weather) unit of the Air Weather Service, United States Air Force. It was established, 24 Nov 1953 and activated on 8 Feb 1954.

History
The wing provided staff and operational meteorological aerospace environmental support to the U.S. European Command, U.S. Air Forces Europe, U.S. Army Europe, European Information Systems Division, elements of other Air Force and Army major commands assigned 
to the European theater, and to the North Atlantic Treaty Organization. It also provided staff meteorological officers to the following NATO organizations: Allied Air Forces Central Europe, Fourth Allied Tactical Air Force and the Central Army Group.

Detachments included:
Det 6, Vaihingen, Germany 
Det 13, Hahn AB, Germany 
Det 40, RAF Croughton, England

Lineage
 Established on 24 November 1953
 Activated on 8 February 1954
 Inactivated on 1 October 1991

Assignments
 Air Weather Service. 8 February 1954 – 1 October 1991 (attached to United States Air Forces Europe)

Components
 18th Weather Squadron, 8 February 1954 – 3 October 1960
 28th Weather Squadron,  8 February 1954 – 30 September 1991
 29th Weather Squadron, 8 February 1954 – 18 May 1958
 31st Weather Squadron, 8 February 1954 – c. 15 September 1991
 53d Weather Reconnaissance Squadron, 8 February 1954 – 18 March 1960
 131st Weather Flight, August 1962 – c. 8 November 1962
 163d Weather Flight, August 1962 – c. 8 November 1962
 164th Weather Flight, August 1962 – c. 8 November 1962

Stations
 Fürstenfeldbruck Air Base, Germany, 8 February 1954 
 Bitburg Air Base, Germany, 6 December 1955 
 Lindsey Air Station, Germany, March 1958 
 Wiesbaden Air Base, Germany, 10 July 1973  
 Lindsey Air Station, Germany, 8 May 1973  
 Ramstein Air Base, Germany, 15 August 1973  
 Kapaun Air Station, Germany, 15 September 1975

References

 Notes

Bibliography

Weather wings of the United States Air Force
Military units and formations established in 1954